= Elisabeth Kehoe =

Author and historian

Elisabeth Sara Kehoe is an author and senior research fellow of the Institute of Historical Research, University of London. She obtained her PhD from the University of London in 2002 on the subject of "The British Museum: The cultural politics of a national institution".

== Selected publications ==
- Fortune’s Daughters: the Extravagant Lives of the Jerome Sisters: Jennie Churchill, Clara Frewen and Leonie Leslie (London: Atlantic, 2004)
- Ireland’s Misfortune: the Turbulent Life of Kitty O’Shea (London: Atlantic, 2008)
- "Daughters of Ireland: Maud Gonne, Dr Kathleen Lynn and Dorothy MacArdle", in The Shaping of Modern Ireland: A Centenary Assessment, edited by Eugenio Biagini and Daniel Mulhall (Dublin: Irish Academic Press, 2016).
- Queen of the Savoy: The Extraordinary Life of Helen D’Oyly Carte 1852-1913 (London:Unicorn, 2022).

== Media appearances ==
- Lady Randy: Churchill's Mother, Channel 4, UK, 2008;
- Secrets of the Manor House: 2 of the 4 series, PBS in the US and Virgin in the UK, 2012;
- Secrets of Chatsworth PBS in US and Virgin in the UK, 2013;
- Million Dollar American Princesses: "Cash for Class", Smithsonian in the US, and ITV in UK, 2015;
- Million Dollar American Princesses: "Wedding of the Century", Smithsonian and ITV, 2015;
- Million Dollar American Princesses: "Movers and Shakers", Smithsonian and ITV, 2015.
